The 1993–94 season was the 97th season of competitive football in Scotland. This season saw several teams relegated from the 1st and 2nd divisions in preparation for the introduction of a 3rd division the following season.

Notable events

The resignation of Scotland national football team manager Andy Roxburgh after seven years in charge, following their failure to qualify for the 1994 FIFA World Cup, and the appointment of Craig Brown as his successor.
The dismissal of Liam Brady as Celtic manager in October after just over two years at the helm, and the appointment of Lou Macari as his successor.
Macari's dismissal as Celtic manager in June, after the end of the season, after just eight months in charge. He was succeeded by Kilmarnock's Tommy Burns.
Rangers paying a British record fee of £4million for Dundee United striker Duncan Ferguson before the start of the season.
Dundee United's shock 1–0 win over Rangers in the Scottish Cup final, which deprived Rangers of a second successive domestic treble.
Rangers signed Tottenham Hotspur striker Gordon Durie for £1.2million in November.
Rangers retained the Premier Division title (their sixth in succession) and the League Cup.
Further league reconstruction would be introduced for the 1994–1995 season resulting in four leagues of ten teams. This meant that there would be a new Scottish Third Division, so this season five teams were relegated from the first division and only one promoted (Stranraer) to the first division. The bottom eight teams of the old second division were 'relegated' to the new third division.

Scottish Premier Division

Champions: Rangers
Relegated: St Johnstone, Raith Rovers, Dundee

Scottish League Division One

Promoted: Falkirk
Relegated: Dumbarton, Stirling Albion, Clyde, Morton, Brechin City

Scottish League Division Two

Promoted: Stranraer
Relegated: Alloa Athletic, Forfar Athletic, East Stirlingshire, Montrose, Queen's Park, Arbroath, Albion Rovers, Cowdenbeath

Other honours

Cup honours

Individual honours

SPFA awards

SFWA awards

Scottish clubs in Europe

Average coefficient – 3.000

Scotland national team

Key:
(H) = Home match
(A) = Away match
WCQG1 = World Cup qualifying – Group 1

See also
1993–94 Dundee United F.C. season
1993–94 Rangers F.C. season

Notes and references

 
Seasons in Scottish football